Little Women: Dallas is an American reality television series that debuted on  November 2, 2016, on Lifetime. It is the fourth spin-off series of the Little Women: LA franchise. The series chronicles the lives of a group of women with dwarfism living in Dallas, Texas.

Cast
 Caylea Woodbury
 Tiffani Chance
 Bri Barlup
 Asta Young
 Emily Fernandez
 Amanda Loy
 Brichelle Humphrey (recurring, season 1)

Episodes

Series overview

Season 1 (2016–2017)

References

External links
 
 
 

2010s American reality television series
2016 American television series debuts
2017 American television series endings
English-language television shows
Lifetime (TV network) original programming
Culture of Dallas
Little Women: LA
Television shows filmed in Texas
American television spin-offs
Reality television spin-offs
Television shows about dwarfism
Women in Dallas